Qaleh Barzand (also Romanized as Qal‘eh Barzand) is a village in Pain Barzand Rural District, Anguti District, Germi County, Ardabil Province, Iran. At the 2006 census, its population was 146, in 37 families.

References 
Notes

Source
Tageo

Towns and villages in Germi County